Peshtera Municipality is a municipality in the Pazardzhik Province of Bulgaria.

Demography

At the 2011 census, the population of Peshtera was 18,899. Most of the inhabitants (65.29%%) were Bulgarians, and there were significant minorities of Gypsies/Romani (3.96%) and Turks (14.79%). 14.85% of the population's ethnicity was unknown.

Communities

Towns
 Peshtera

Villages
 Kapitan Dimitrievo
 Radilovo

References

Municipalities in Pazardzhik Province